The  peppershrikes are two species of passerine bird found in tropical Central and South America.  They form the genus Cyclarhis, part of the vireo family.

These are heavyset birds with a hooked shrike-like bill.  Although sluggish and very vocal, the peppershrikes are still difficult to spot as they feed on insects and spiders in the canopy aloft.  Their cup-shaped nests can likewise be found high in the trees.

Species

References 

.
Birds of Central America
Birds of South America
Vireonidae